Gibbula eikoae is a species of sea snail, a marine gastropod mollusk in the family Trochidae, the top snails.

Description
The size of the shell varies between 5 mm and 15 mm.

Distribution
This marine shell occurs off the Philippines and in the East China Sea.

References

External links
 

eikoae
Gastropods described in 2006